The 2022–23 VTB United League will be the 13th season of the VTB United League. It will be the 10th season that the league functions as the Russian domestic top tier level. It was started on 2 October 2022 with the regular season and will end in June 2023 with the finals.

Zenit Saint Petersburg will be the defending champion.

Format changes 
For this season, the regular season will be divided into two phases since none team will participate in European competitions due to the Russian invasion of Ukraine. At the first phase, 12 teams will play two rounds, after which the teams will be divided into two groups: Group A with top six teams from first phase and Group B with last six teams from first phase. At the second phase, the teams will play among themselves in their groups for two more rounds. For the playoffs, all series will be played in best-of-seven playoffs, except for the quarterfinals that will be played in best-of-five playoffs.

Teams 
A total of 12 teams will contest the league, including 10 sides from the 2021–22 season (eight Russian teams, one Belarusian team and one Kazakhstani team) and two newly-joined Russian sides (Samara and MBA Moscow). Other two Russian sides (Uralmash Ekaterinburg and Runa Moscow) also applied to participate, but they did not fulfill the requirements to join the league.

Venues and locations

First stage

Standings

Results

Second stage

Group A

Group B

Playoffs 

Source: VTB United League

Awards

MVP of the Month

References

External links 
 Official website 

VTB
VTB United League seasons